Melchor Island (Spanish Isla Melchor also known as Meleguen in the NGA) is an island in the Chonos Archipelago of Chile.

See also
 List of islands of Chile

External links
 Islands of Chile @ United Nations Environment Programme
 World island information @ WorldIslandInfo.com
 South America Island High Points above 1000 meters
 United States Hydrographic Office, South America Pilot (1916)

Chonos Archipelago

es:Archipiélago de los Chonos#Isla Melchor